Beeman Hollow is a valley in McDonald County in the U.S. state of Missouri.

Beeman Hollow was named after James Bee(m)an, a pioneer citizen.

References

Valleys of McDonald County, Missouri
Valleys of Missouri